Mount Union is an unincorporated community and census-designated place (CDP) in Henry County, Iowa, United States. It was formerly a city, but in a November 2016 referendum residents voted 32 to 31 to unincorporate. The 2010 census reported the city population to be 107.

Geography
Mount Union is located at  (41.057503, -91.390758).

Demographics

2010 census
As of the census of 2010, there were 107 people, 43 households, and 27 families living in the city. The racial makeup of the city was 100.0% White. Hispanic or Latino of any race were 3.7% of the population.

There were 43 households, of which 37.2% had children under the age of 18 living with them, 51.2% were married couples living together, 7.0% had a female householder with no husband present, 4.7% had a male householder with no wife present, and 37.2% were non-families. 32.6% of all households were made up of individuals, and 9.4% had someone living alone who was 65 years of age or older. The average household size was 2.49 and the average family size was 3.26.

The median age in the city was 35.9 years. 32.7% of residents were under the age of 18; 1.7% were between the ages of 18 and 24; 22.5% were from 25 to 44; 29.9% were from 45 to 64; and 13.1% were 65 years of age or older. The gender makeup of the city was 48.6% male and 51.4% female.

2000 census
As of the census of 2000, there were 132 people, 51 households, and 39 families living in the city. The racial makeup of the city was 96.97% White, and 3.03% from two or more races.

There were 51 households, out of which 43.1% had children under the age of 18 living with them, 68.6% were married couples living together, and 23.5% were non-families. 21.6% of all households were made up of individuals, and 3.9% had someone living alone who was 65 years of age or older. The average household size was 2.59 and the average family size was 2.97.

In the city, the population was spread out, with 30.3% under the age of 18, 3.0% from 18 to 24, 37.9% from 25 to 44, 18.2% from 45 to 64, and 10.6% who were 65 years of age or older. The median age was 34 years. For every 100 females, there were 88.6 males. For every 100 females age 18 and over, there were 104.4 males.

The median income for a household in the city was $27,500, and the median income for a family was $31,250. Males had a median income of $30,714 versus $22,500 for females. The per capita income for the city was $12,735. There were 20.0% of families and 21.6% of the population living below the poverty line, including 6.8% of under eighteens and 25.0% of those over 64.

Education
Mount Union is part of the Winfield-Mt. Union Community School District.

Notable person
Leo Thomas Maher, Catholic bishop

References

Former populated places in Iowa
Census-designated places in Henry County, Iowa
Census-designated places in Iowa
2016 disestablishments in Iowa
Populated places disestablished in 2016